The Norrporten Ladies Open was a women's professional golf tournament on the Swedish Golf Tour and LET Access Series played between 2011 and 2017 in Sundsvall, Sweden.

The tournament was sponsored by Norrporten AB with seat in Sundsvall, and changed its name after the company was acquired by Castellum AB in 2016.

Winners

^Shortened to 36 holes due to weather

References

External links

LET Access Series events
Swedish Golf Tour (women) events
Golf tournaments in Sweden